The Society of Motion Picture and Television Engineers (SMPTE) (rarely ), founded in 1916 as the Society of Motion Picture Engineers or SMPE, is a global professional association of engineers, technologists, and executives working in the media and entertainment industry. As an internationally recognized standards organization, SMPTE has published more than 800 technical standards and related documents for broadcast, filmmaking, digital cinema, audio recording, information technology (IT), and medical imaging. 

SMPTE also publishes the SMPTE Motion Imaging Journal, provides networking opportunities for its members, produces academic conferences and exhibitions, and performs other industry-related functions. SMPTE membership is open to any individual or organization with an interest in the subject matter. In the US, SMPTE is a 501(c)3 non-profit charitable organization.

History
The Motion Picture and Television Engineers was founded in 1916 by Charles Francis Jenkins, who was the first president of the organization.

Educational and professional development activities
SMPTE's educational and professional development activities include technical presentations at regular meetings of its local Sections, annual and biennial conferences in the US and Australia and the SMPTE Motion Imaging Journal.  The society sponsors many awards, the oldest of which are the SMPTE Progress Medal, the Samuel Warner Memorial Medal, and the David Sarnoff Medal. SMPTE also has a number of Student Chapters and sponsors scholarships for college students in the motion imaging disciplines.

Standards
 
SMPTE standards documents are copyrighted and may be purchased from the SMPTE website, or other distributors of technical standards. Standards documents may be purchased by the general public. Significant standards promulgated by SMPTE include:

All film and television transmission formats and media, including digital.
Physical interfaces for transmission of television signals and related data (such as SMPTE time code and the serial digital interface) (SDI)
SMPTE color bars
Test card patterns and other diagnostic tools
The Material Exchange Format (MXF)
SMPTE 2110
SMPTE ST 421:2013 (VC-1 video codec)

Film format 
SMP(T)E'S first standard was to get everyone using 35-mm film width, four sprocket holes per frame, 1.37:1 picture ratio. Until then, there were competing film formats. With the standard, theaters could all run the same films.

Film frame rate 
SMP(T)E's standard in 1927 was for speed at which sound film is shown, 24 frames per second.

3D television 
SMPTE's taskforce on "3D to the home" produced a report on the issues and challenges and suggested minimum standards for the 3D home master that would be distributed after post-production to the ingest points of distribution channels for 3D video content.  A group within the standards committees has begun to work on the formal definition of the SMPTE 3D Home Master.

Digital cinema 
In 1999, SMPTE established the DC28 technology committee, for the foundations of Digital Cinema.

Membership

SMPTE Fellows 

 Terry Adams, NBC Olympics, LLC
 Andy Beale, BT Sport
 Lynn D. Claudy, National Association of Broadcasters
 Lawrence R. Kaplan, CEO of SDVI

Honors and awards program
The SMPTE presents awards to individuals for outstanding contributions in fields of the society.

Honorary membership and the honor roll 
Recipients include:

 Renville "Ren" H. McMann Jr. (2017)
 James Cameron (2016)
 Oscar B. "O.B." Hanson (2015)
 George Lucas (2014)
 John Logie Baird (2014)
 Philo Taylor Farnsworth (1996)
 Ray M. Dolby (1992)
 Linwood G. Dunn (1984)
 Herbert T. Kalmus (1958)
 Walt Disney (1955)
 Vladimir K. Zworykin (1950)
 Samuel L. Warner (1946)
 George Eastman (1928)
 Thomas Alva Edison (1928)
 Louis Lumiere (1928)
 C. Francis Jenkins (1926)

Progress Medal
The Progress Medal, instituted in 1935, is SMPTE's oldest and most prestigious medal, and is awarded annually for contributions to engineering aspects of the film and/or television industries.

Recipients include:

 Douglas Trumbull (2016)
 Ioan Allen (2014)
 David Wood (2012)
 Edwin Catmull (2011)
 Birney Dayton (2008)
 Clyde D. Smith (2007)
 Roderick Snell (2006)
 S. Merrill Weiss (2005)
 Dr. Kees Immink (2004)
 Stanley N. Baron (2003)
 William C. Miller (2002)
 Bernard J. Lechner (2001)
 Edwin E. Catmall (1996)
 Ray Dolby (1983)
 Harold E. Edgerton (1959)
 Fred Waller (1953)
 Vladimir K. Zworykin (1950)
 John G. Frayne (1947)
 Walt Disney (1940)
 Herbert Kalmus (1938)
 Edward W. Kellogg (1937)
 Kenneth Mees (1936)

David Sarnoff Gold Medal

Chuck Pagano (2013)
James M. DeFilippis (2012)
Bernard J. Lechner (1996)
Stanley N. Baron (1991)
William F. Schreiber (1990)
Adrian Ettlinger (1976)
Joseph A. Flaherty, Jr. (1974)
Peter C. Goldmark (1969)
W. R. G. Baker (1959)
Albert Rose (1958)
Charles Ginsburg (1957)
Robert E. Shelby (1956)
Arthur V. Loughren (1953)
Otto H. Schade (1951)

Eastman Kodak Gold Medal
The Eastman Kodak Gold Medal, instituted in 1967, recognizes outstanding contributions which lead to new or unique educational programs utilizing motion pictures, television, high-speed and instrumentation photography or other photography sciences. Recent recipients are

Andrew Laszlo (2006)
 James MacKay (2005)
Dr. Roderick T. Ryan (2004)
George Spiro Dibie (2003)
Jean-Pierre Beauviala (2002)

Related organizations
Related organizations include
 Advanced Television Systems Committee (ATSC)
 Moving Picture Experts Group (MPEG)
 Joint Photographic Experts Group (JPEG)
 ITU Radiocommunication Sector (formerly known as the CCIR)
 ITU Telecommunication Sector (formerly known as the CCITT)
 Digital Video Broadcasting
 BBC Research Department
 European Broadcasting Union (EBU)

See also 
 Digital Picture Exchange
 General Exchange Format (GXF)
 Glossary of video terms
 Outline of film (Extensive alphabetical listing)
 Media Dispatch Protocol SMPTE 2032 parts 1, 2 and 3
 Video tape recorder (VTR) standards defined by SMPTE

References

Bibliography 
 Charles S. Swartz (editor). Understanding Digital Cinema. A Professional Handbook. Elsevier, 2005.

1916 establishments in the United States
3D imaging
Broadcast engineering
Economy of Westchester County, New York
Film and video technology
Organizations awarded an Academy Honorary Award
Organizations based in New York (state)
Science and technology in New York (state)
Television terminology
White Plains, New York